Salesforce East is a skyscraper in the South of Market district of San Francisco, California.

It has attained LEED Platinum status.

Location
350 Mission Street is located at the northeast corner of Fremont Street and Mission Street in a part of the South of Market district typically considered an extension of the Financial District. It is located near several other downtown skyscrapers, including the adjacent Blue Shield of California Building and 45 Fremont Street. Across Fremont Street to the west is 50 Fremont Center, and across Mission Street to the east is Millennium Tower. To the south, at the opposite corner of the intersection is the site of the Transbay Tower. It is located a block from Market Street and a half block from the new Transbay Transit Center.

History

The second version of the project was compliant with the local  height restriction. The third version stood significantly shorter than the proposed height limit because the developer stated that it was uneconomical to build any taller on a -sized lot.

In October 2012, GLL Development & Management sold the project to Kilroy Realty for US$52 million. In February 2013, demolition started on the site's existing four-story building, formerly the home of Heald College. On August 15, 2013, the S.F. Planning Commission officially approved the height increase to 30 stories. Kilroy completed the project in 2015.

See also

List of tallest buildings in San Francisco

References

External links

South of Market, San Francisco
Skyscraper office buildings in San Francisco
Skidmore, Owings & Merrill buildings
Leadership in Energy and Environmental Design platinum certified buildings
Office buildings completed in 2015